Rutanya Alda (born Rūta Skrastiņa; October 13, 1942) is a Latvian-American actress. She began her career in the late 1960s, and went on to have supporting parts in The Deer Hunter (1978), Rocky II (1979), and Mommie Dearest (1981). She also appeared in a lead role in the horror films Amityville II: The Possession and Girls Nite Out (both 1982).

Life
Rutanya Alda was born Rutanja Skrastiņa (Rūta Skrastiņa) in Riga, in German-occupied Latvia, the daughter of Vera (née Ozoliņa), a businesswoman, and Jānis Skrastiņš, a poet. Alda, her grandmother, her mother and her brother spent seven years in a displaced persons camp in Allied-occupied Germany after World War II. She then relocated with her family to the United States, briefly living in Chicago before settling in Flagstaff, Arizona.

Career
With a career spanning nearly 50 years in show business and over 100 roles, Alda might be best known for her performances in The Deer Hunter as Steven's wife, Angela, as well as for the cult classic Mommie Dearest, as loyal Crawford housekeeper Carol Ann, and Amityville II: The Possession, having been nominated for the Golden Raspberry Award two years in succession (1982 and 1983) for the latter roles. She has also won a Clio and is a member of the Academy of Motion Picture Arts and Sciences. Additionally, Alda has appeared in numerous television programs, such as Cold Case and CSI: Crime Scene Investigation, and as a featured character in the Ron Perlman/Linda Hamilton TV series Beauty and the Beast, as well as commercials and stage work.

In 2009, she appeared in Stolen, playing the elder version of Jessica Chastain's character, and had a supporting role in the horror film Late Phases (2014). Between 2014 and 2016, Alda appeared in the web series Old Dogs & New Tricks.

Personal life
She was married to actor Richard Bright from 1977 until his death in 2006, when he was hit by a bus in New York City. They had one son, Jeremy.

Filmography

Film

Select television roles

Web
Old Dogs & New Tricks (2014–16) – Barbara Fiere

References

Further reading
 "The Lady of the House" by Lee Gambin, Fangoria magazine #317, October 2012, pages 56–57, 97. Interview of Rutanya Alda regarding her role in Amityville II: The Possession. Three-page article has four photos of Alda, one recent, with additional images related to the film.
 David Dye. Child and Youth Actors: Filmography of Their Entire Careers, 1914-1985. Jefferson, NC: McFarland & Co., 1988, p. 4.

External links

1942 births
Living people
American film actresses
American television actresses
Latvian World War II refugees
Soviet emigrants to the United States
Actors from Riga
20th-century American actresses
21st-century American actresses